Western National Bank (WNB) was an individually and privately owned bank that was chartered in 1977 in Odessa, Texas.

History
Western National Bank was chartered in 1977 and among the charter members were the Wood family.  During the great oil bust of the 1980s, the Wood family saw the need for money to be invested in the bank and bought out the other investors. Western National Bank was one of the few banks that was established during that time and operated under the same name until it merged with Frost Bank.

On June 20, 2014, Western National Bank was absorbed by Frost Bank. All seven Midland/Odessa branches became Frost Bank offices, and the San Antonio Western National Bank branch was closed.

References

Banks based in Texas
Defunct banks of the United States